Miroslav Bartůšek (11 August 1921 – 18 December 1985) was a Czech swimmer. He competed in two events at the 1948 Summer Olympics. He died on 18 December 1985, at the age of 64.

References

External links
 

1921 births
1985 deaths
Czech male swimmers
Olympic swimmers of Czechoslovakia
Swimmers at the 1948 Summer Olympics
Sportspeople from Prague